Maddur (Village ID 574704) is a village and panchayat in Ranga Reddy district, Andhra Pradesh, India. It falls under Shabad mandal. According to the 2011 census it has a population of 1936 living in 415 households.

References

Villages in Ranga Reddy district